Penny Black is a 2015 New Zealand independent comedy film produced by Fiona Jackson, and directed by Joe Hitchcock.

Plot
Beautiful Penny Black rose to fame as the face of Ubernu, the mega-corporation taking over the world. Penny likes the high life, expensive clothes, and fancy restaurants, but she just became guardian for her sister, Alex. She's 18 going on 8, always dresses like her favorite superhero, Lapwing, and she's driving Penny crazy! When she inadvertently sabotages a photoshoot, drives Penny into a public rage, and puts Penny's modelling career in jeopardy, she panics and heads for Wellington to try to win her job back.

Without anywhere to leave Alex she reluctantly packs her in the car, too, and they hit the road, cruising south till Penny accidentally plants the car into a paddock. Luckily, Guy, a charismatic activist picks them up and offers to take them both to Wellington.

Guy is smart, charming and has a different way of looking at the world, and Penny soon warms to his apple tree planting, dumpster diving, billboard altering ways.

But in the middle of their mayhem, adventure, and bending the law, things start to go wrong...

Cast
 Astra McLaren as Penny Black
 Anton Tennet as Guy
 Toni Garson as Alex Black
 Sash Nixon as Lapwing
 Ross MacLeod as Henchmen

Production
Penny Black features a core cast of three, and went into pre-production in October 2011. The film was completed in 2015 and premiered at the Arohanui Film festival in Te Aroha. Sponsors included Wicked Campers, Phoenix Organic and Whittakers with funding topped up by a PledgeMe campaign.

Penny Black was filmed on RED Scarlet from July–Oct 2012 in Auckland, Pukekohe, Hamilton, Te Aroha, Taupo, Napier, and Wellington, New Zealand.

The role of Penny's sister, Alex Black, was originally a male role, but when finding an actor with availability throughout the filming period became difficult the production team started to consider changing the role to a sister. When they found Toni, a Te Aroha College student, they decided she was perfect for the role and rewrote the script to suit her.

During production Astra McLaren became vegan which she attributes partly to the theme of Penny Black opening her eyes and giving her time to think about issues she already knew were there.

A short film entitled 'Lapwing' was made to be used within the narrative of Penny Black, and to provide back story for the superhero character. It was largely shot on the grounds of the University of Waikato, Hamilton, New Zealand.

See also 
 Penny Black, the world's first adhesive postage stamp, issued in 1840

References

External links 
 
 Penny Black at NZ On Screen
 

2010s English-language films
2015 films
2015 comedy films
New Zealand comedy films